The Diocese of Wheeling–Charleston is a Latin Church ecclesiastical territory, or diocese, of the Catholic Church comprising the U.S. state of West Virginia. The ordinary is Bishop Mark E. Brennan. The diocese maintains two cathedrals: the Cathedral of Saint Joseph in Wheeling, West Virginia, and the Basilica of the Co-Cathedral of the Sacred Heart in Charleston, West Virginia. The Diocese of Wheeling–Charleston is a suffragan diocese in the ecclesiastical province of the metropolitan Archdiocese of Baltimore.

History

1700 to 1920 
Before the American Revolution, few Catholics lived in the area of present day West Virginia, then part of the British Colony of Virginia.  The colonial government in the later 1600's had outlawed the practice of Catholicism.  With the 1786 passage of Virginia Statute for Religious Freedom, proposed by future US President Thomas Jefferson, Catholics were granted religious freedom in the new state of Virginia. Pope Pius VII erected the Diocese of Richmond on July 11, 1820, covering all of Virginia, and named Reverend Richard Whelan as its first bishop
In the 1840's, Whelan became concerned that his diocese was too vast to administer. He therefore requested that the Vatican divide the diocese, using the Allegheny mountains as a natural boundary.  Pope Pius IX on July 19, 1850, erected the Diocese of Wheeling, containing the area of Virginia west of the Pennsylvania state border and west of the Allegheny Mountains.  He designated the new diocese as a suffragan of the  Archdiocese of Baltimore.  Pius IX appointed Whelan as the first bishop of the Diocese of Wheeling.

During Whelan's 24 year tenure as bishop of Wheeling, he built 42 churches, nine schools, one orphanage, and a hospital. By the time of his death in 1874, the Catholic population of the diocese numbered around 18,000. Pope Leo XIII replaced Whelan with Reverend John Joseph Kain in 1875.  After 18 years, Leo XIII named Kain as coadjutor archbishop of the Archdiocese of St. Louis in 1893 and appointed Patrick James Donahue of the Archdiocese of Baltimore as the new bishop of Wheeling in 1894.

Donahue established 38 parishes, six missions, four hospitals, two monasteries, an orphanage and several schools in the diocese. He also established the first official diocesan periodical, The Church Calendar, in 1895 and held the sixth diocesan synod in 1899. The number of priests serving the diocese more than tripled and the number of Catholics increased from 20,000 to 62,000. For all these many achievements, he earned the nickname of the "Great Builder."

1920 to 1960 
In 1922, Pope Pius XI appointed John Swint as an auxiliary bishop of the Diocese of Wheeling.  When Donahue later that year, the pope named Swint as Donahue's replacement. While the diocese had long served the Italian, Irish, and Polish immigrant groups, the major population growth came during Swint's tenure. During his 40 years as bishop, the population of the diocese doubled. He oversaw the building of a new cathedral, 100 churches, Wheeling Jesuit College, 52 elementary and high schools, and five hospitals.

In 1948, Swint threatened to excommunicate any Catholic women from the diocese who participated in the Miss West Virginia competition for the Miss America pageant.  He called the pageant "pagan" and stated that if "nakedness" were removed from the pageant, it would "fall to pieces". Two women withdrew from competition, but one contestant, Mariruth Ford, ignored his ban and participated, winning the title of queen for West Virginia.

In July 1952, Swint condemned the planned opening of a Planned Parenthood clinic in Parkersburg, West Virginia, that would provide contraception services to women.  He said it was part of a national plan by doctors to break the Catholic Church's ban on birth control. Swint received the personal title of archbishop from the Vatican on March 12, 1954.

1960 to 1990 
In 1961, Pope John XXIII appointed Auxilibary Bishop Joseph Howard Hodges from the Diocese of Richmond as coadjutor bishop in Wheeling to assist Swint.  Swint died the next year and Hodges automatically succeeded him as bishop.

Hodges dedicated much of his administration to implementing the reforms of the Second Vatican Council in the diocese, establishing a Liturgical Commission, Priests' Senate, Sisters' Council, and Cursillo movement. A strong supporter of ecumenism, Hodges established a Commission for Religious Unity in 1964, co-founded the Joint Commission of Roman Catholics and Episcopalians in 1978 with the episcopal bishop of West Virginia, and joined the West Virginia Council of Churches in 1981. He mandated parish councils in 1968, introduced extraordinary ministers in 1970 and permanent deacons in 1975, and renovated the exterior and interior of St. Joseph's Cathedral in Wheeling in 1973. 

When the State of West Virginia was admitted to the Union in 1863 during the American Civil War, the new state line with Virginia did not match the diocesan boundaries.  Some West Virginia parishes were in the Diocese of Richmond and some Virginia parishes were in the Diocese of Wheeling.  On May 28, 1974, Pope Paul VI remedied this geographic disparity by transferring the West Virginia parishes to the Diocese of Wheeling and the Virginia parishes to the Diocese of Richmond.  Paul VI renamed the Diocese of Wheeling as the Diocese of Wheeling–Charleston on August 21, 1974.  He designated the Church of the Sacred Heart in Charleston, West Virginia as the co-cathedral. Hodges died in 1985.

Pope John Paul II named Auxiliary Bishop Francis B. Schulte from the Archdiocese of Philadelphia as the new bishop of Wheeling-Charleston in 1985. In 1988, After only four years, the pope appointed Reverend Bernard Schmitt as auxiliary bishop of the diocese. A year later, John Paul II appointed Schulte as archbishop of the Archdiocese of New Orleans and replaced him in West Virginia with Schmitt.

1990 to present 
Schmitt resigned in 2004 and John Paul II replaced him with Reverend Michael J. Bransfield from the Archdiocese of Philadelphia. Pope Benedict XVI  raised Sacred Heart to a minor basilica on November 9, 2009.

On September 13, 2018, Pope Francis accepted the resignation of Bransfield and appointed Archbishop William E. Lori as apostolic administrator. Francis then instructed Lori to investigate allegations of sexual harassment of adults against  Bransfield. In 2019, Francis appointed Auxiliary Bishop Mark E. Brennan from the Archdiocese of Baltimore as the new bishop of Wheeling-Charleston.  Brennan is the current bishop of the diocese.

Tracy investment portfolio
The Diocese of Wheeling-Charleston owns a multi-million dollar investment portfolio that was inherited from Sara Tracy in the early 20th century. Born on December 6, 1827, in New York City, Tracy inherited a large estate from her brother, Edward Tracy. While on a voyage to Rome in 1899, she met Bishop  Donahue on the ship. Tracy consulted with Donahue during their trip on a personal matter. As they disembarked in Europe, Tracy gave him a check of $5,000 for the needs of the diocese. 

Tracy continued to support the diocese while she lived and willed her entire estate to Donahue. The proceeds allowed Donahue to establish Wheeling Jesuit College and build other facilities across the diocese, as well as to found numerous outreach ministries. The investments included oil and gas lands that produced substantial revenues over the decades. Bishop Bransfield used the Tracy portfolio to improperly withdraw funds for his personal use. Bishop Brennan was the first bishop to fully disclose and list the value of the investments from the portfolio.

As of 2020, the Tracy portfolio exceeded $286 million dollars in value.  Annual royalty revenues were $13.9 million dollars, with total revenues from investments exceeding $15 million dollars for that year.

Sexual abuse scandal
On November 29, 2018, the Diocese of Wheeling–Charleston released the names of 18 clergy who had been "credibly accused" of sexually abusing minors while serving in the diocese. The list also revealed the names of 13 priests who were transferred to the diocese after being accused of committing sex abuse in other Catholic dioceses. The Reverend Felix Owino, a diocesan professor at  Wheeling Jesuit University, was convicted in Virginia in 2010 of sexually abusing a young girl there.  He was deported to his country in Africa after the conviction Reported incidents of sex abuse on this list date back to 1950. Eleven of the clergy on the list were deceased at the time of its release.

Bransfield scandal 
On July 19, 2019, Francis removed Bransfield from public ministry in the Catholic church and also barred him from residing in the diocese. Francis also told Bransfield that he must consult with the diocese on a financial repayment plan. Francis appointed Bishop Brennan, then auxiliary bishop of Baltimore, as bishop of Wheeling-Charleston on July 23, 2019, with his installation taking place on August 22, 2019. On August  21, 2019, the first sexual abuse case against Bransfield was settled. On November  26, 2019, Bransfield was ordered by Brennan to pay more settlements, and also forfeit financial and personal benefits from the diocese.

Lawsuits 
In March 2019, West Virginia Attorney General Patrick Morrisey filed a civil lawsuit against the Diocese of Wheeling–Charleston and Bransfield, alleging violations of West Virginia consumer protection laws. Morrisey said that the diocese advertised itself as a safe place for children while "knowingly employed pedophiles and failed to conduct adequate background checks" on workers in Catholic schools and camps. The lawsuit was groundbreaking because it named a diocese as a defendant, rather than individual priests, and because it sought to make use of consumer-protection law to obtain legal discovery of church records.

On August 21, 2019, the first sex abuse lawsuit against Bransfield was settled.On September 30, 2019, it was revealed that a second sex abuse lawsuit had been filed against Bransfield and that both lawsuits against Bransfield included the diocese.

In June 2019, after details of the report became public, Morrisey called for the report to be publicly released, and the SNAP, the Survivors Network called for a law enforcement investigation.

In October 2019, the Washington Post reported that police were investigating an allegation that Bransfield molested a nine-year-old girl during a September 2012 pilgrimage to the Basilica of the National Shrine of the Immaculate Conception in Washington, D.C., The diocese was subpoenaed for documents in connection with the investigation. Bransfield denied the allegation.

On November 26, 2019, Brennan ordered Bransfield to pay restitution to the diocese in the amount of $792,638 (and $110,000 in back taxes to the Internal Revenue Service) and to issue an apology "for the severe emotional and spiritual harm his actions caused" to his victims and to the diocese. Brennan also revoked certain retirement benefits of Bransfield and barred him from being buried in the diocesan cemetery. The directive was believed to be a rare or unprecedented example of a bishop being ordered to pay restitution. The survivors' group SNAP criticized the measures as insufficient because they suggested "that Bransfield alone should make reparations"; the group called for consequences for Church officials who concealed, or failed to address, Bransfield's conduct. The Vatican later agreed to lower Bransfield's required restitution.

Bransfield apology 
On August 20, 2020, an apology written by Bransfield after he paid $441,000 to the Diocese was made public. In his letter, dated August 15, 2020, Bransfield wrote “I am writing to apologize for any scandal or wonderment caused by words or actions attributed to me during my tenure as Bishop of the Wheeling–Charleston Diocese.”

Bishops

Bishops of Wheeling
 Richard Vincent Whelan (1850–1874) 
 John Joseph Kain (1875–1893), appointed Coadjutor Archbishop of St. Louis and later succeeded to that see
 Patrick James Donahue (1894–1922)
 John Joseph Swint (1922–1962), appointed Archbishop ad personam in 1954  - Thomas John McDonnell (coadjutor bishop 1951–1961); died before succession
 Joseph Howard Hodges (1962–1974); title changed with title of diocese

Bishops of Wheeling–Charleston
 Joseph Howard Hodges (1974–1985)
 Francis B. Schulte (1985–1988), appointed Archbishop of New Orleans
 Bernard William Schmitt (1989–2004)
 Michael Joseph Bransfield (2004–2018)
 Mark E. Brennan (2019–present)

Auxiliary bishops of Wheeling
John Joseph Swint (1922), appointed Bishop of Wheeling
James Edward Michaels, S.S.C.M.E. (1973–1974); title changed with title of diocese

Auxiliary bishops of Wheeling–Charleston
James Edward Michaels, S.S.C.M.E. (1974–1987)
Bernard William Schmitt (1988–1989), appointed bishop of this diocese

Vicariates

There are seven vicariates in the Diocese:
Wheeling Vicariate
Parkersburg Vicariate
Charleston Vicariate
Beckley Vicariate
Weston Vicariate
Clarksburg Vicariate
Martinsburg Vicariate

High schools

Present high schools
 Charleston Catholic High School, Charleston
 Madonna High School, Weirton
 Notre Dame High School, Clarksburg
 Parkersburg Catholic High School, Parkersburg
 St. Joseph Central Catholic High School, Huntington
 Wheeling Central Catholic High School, Wheeling

Former schools
 Mount de Chantal Visitation Academy, Wheeling
 St. Francis de Sales Central Catholic, Morgantown. Now operates Pre-k through 8th grade only.
 St. Patrick, Weston
 De Sales Heights Academy, Parkersburg
 St. Margaret Mary (Elementary), Parkersburg
 St. Joseph Preparatory Seminary, Parkersburg
 Bishop Donahue Memorial High School, McMechen

Universities
 Wheeling University
 Catholic Distance University, was founded by Bishop Thomas Welsh of Arlington in Virginia, but later relocated to West Virginia

See also

 Historical list of the Catholic bishops of the United States
 List of the Catholic dioceses of the United States
 List of Roman Catholic archdioceses (by country and continent)
 List of Roman Catholic dioceses (alphabetical) (including archdioceses)
 List of Roman Catholic dioceses (structured view) (including archdioceses)

References

External links
Roman Catholic Diocese of Wheeling–Charleston Official Site
Catholic Hierarchy Profile of the Diocese of Wheeling–Charleston

 
Wheeling–Charleston
Wheeling–Charleston
Diocese
Wheeling–Charleston
Wheeling–Charleston
1850 establishments in Virginia